Local Hero or Local Heroes may refer to:
Local Hero (film), a 1983 Scottish comedy-drama by Bill Forsyth
Local Hero (soundtrack), a music album by Mark Knopfler from the film
Local Hero (musical), a 2019 musical based on the film
Local hero (Japan), a Japanese superhero
Local Hero (TV series), a 2016 South Korean television drama
Local Hero Award, a part of the Australian of the Year awards
Local Heroes (company), a British online business 
Local Heroes (British TV series), a 1991 science and history television series
Local Heroes (American TV series), a 1996 comedy series